Miss World 1989, the 39th edition of the Miss World pageant, was held on 22 November 1989 at the Hong Kong Convention and Exhibition Centre. 78 contestants took part in the pageant. It was the first time in history that Miss World ventured overseas. It was also the first time the Soviet Union has sent a contestant in any major pageant. The winner was Aneta Kręglicka of Polish People's Republic, who was the first Eastern European person to win the competition. She was crowned by Miss World 1988, Linda Pétursdóttir of Iceland.

Results

Placements

Continental Queens of Beauty

Contestants

Judges

 Eric Morley † 
 Krish Naidoo † 
 Brian Daniels
 Rob Brandt
 Diane Hsin
 Peter Lam
 Giselle Laronde – Miss World 1986 from Trinidad & Tobago
 Richard Caring
 George Pitman

Notes

Debuts

 
  (Latvian Soviet Socialist Republic)

Returns

Last competed in 1969:
 
Last competed in 1985:
 
 
Last competed in 1987:

Replacements
  – Yulia Sukhanova did not compete due to parental refusal to sign any contract with the Miss USSR organizers due to being underaged or overaged.

Withdrawals

 
 
 
 
  (Lithuanian Soviet Socialist Republic) - Liucija Gruzdytė
 
 
 
 
  – National pageant postponed
  – Due to a civil war

Other Notes
  – Aneta Kręglicka also competed at Miss International in 1989, where she placed second to Iris Klein. 45 days later, she went to compete in Miss World where she won the crown, becoming the first Polish woman that have ever won Miss World, then later won again  in 2021 by Karolina Bielawska.

References

External links
 Pageantopolis – Miss World 1989

Miss World
1989 in Hong Kong
1989 beauty pageants
Beauty pageants in Hong Kong
November 1989 events in Asia